The following outline is provided as an overview of and topical guide to spirituality:

Spirituality may refer to an ultimate or an alleged immaterial reality, an inner path enabling a person to discover the essence of his/her being, or the "deepest values and meanings by which people live."

Spiritual practices, including meditation, prayer and contemplation, are intended to develop an individual's inner life; spiritual experience includes that of connectedness with a larger reality, yielding a more comprehensive self; with other individuals or the human community; with nature or the cosmos; or with the divine realm.

Introductory topics
 Paranormal
 Extra-sensory perception
 Near-death experience
 Parapsychology (Paraphysics)
 Anomalous cognition
 Claims of parapsychology
 History of parapsychology
 Precognition
 Psychokinesis
 Remote viewing
 Uri Geller
 Philosophy
 Epistemology
 Ethics
 Free will
 Idealism
 Materialism
 Metaphysics
 Mechanism
 Mind-body dualism
 Mind-body problem
 Nondualism
 Noumenon
 Phenomenalism
 Phenomenon
 Philosophy of mind
 Philosophy of religion
 Philosophy of science
 Reductionism
 Spiritualism
 Skepticism
 Truth
 Vitalism
 Religion
 Agnosticism
 Animism
 Atheism
 Cult
 Faith
 Gnosticism
 God
 Goddess
 Higher consciousness
 Monotheism
 Mythology
 Neo-Pantheism
 New religious movement
 Pantheism
 Polytheism
 Prayer
 Religious naturalism
 Soul
 Spiritism
 Spiritual being
 Science
 Altered state of consciousness
 Brain
 Chaos theory
 Chemistry
 Cognitive psychology
 Consciousness
 Magical thinking
 Neuropsychology
 Odic force
 Paraphysics
 Parapsychology
 Physics
 Pseudoscience
 Psychiatry
 Psychology
 Quantum mechanics
 Superstition
 Unconscious mind
 Spirituality
 Esotericism
 Ietsism
 Karma
 Meditation
 Merkabah
 Mysticism
 New Age
 Occultism
 Reincarnation
 Subtle body

Eastern

Esotericism and mysticism

Shabda
 Eckankar
 Harold Klemp
 Quan Yin Method
 Suma Ching Hai
 Sant Mat
 Baba Sawan Singh
 Radha Soami Satsang Beas
 Sant Baljit Singh
 Sant Kirpal Singh
 Sant Thakar Singh
 Shiv Dayal Singh
 Surat Shabda Yoga
 Techniques of Knowledge
 Prem Rawat

Other topics
 Chakra
 Ajna / Mind's eye / Third eye
 Anahata
 Bindu
 Manipura
 Muladhara
 Sahasrara
 Subud, or Susila Budhi Dharma
 Swadhisthana
 Vishuddha
 Kundalini energy
 Planes of existence
 Tantra
 The Urantia Book
 Yoga

Philosophy and religion
 Buddhism
 Mahayana Buddhism
 Theravada
 Vajrayana (Tibetan Buddhism)
 Zen
 Hinduism
 Bhakti yoga
 Jnana Yoga
 Karma yoga
 List of sutras
 Śruti
 Smriti
 Tantra
 Upanishads
 Vedanta
 Yoga
 I Ching
 Sikhism
 The Sikh Gurus
 Guru Granth Sahib
 Sikh religious philosophy
 List of Sikhism-related topics
 Taoism
 Lao Zi
 Dao De Jing
 Taiji
 Universal Dialectic
 Yin Yang
 The Urantia Book

Paths

Inner path
"Inner path", as a spiritual or religious concept, is referred to in:
 Spiritual paths
 Involution (Meher Baba)
 Eckankar
 Salik
 Burhaniya
 Gilgul
 Nizari
 Sulook
 Involution (esoterism)
 Ordre Reaux Croix
 Universal Life
 Surat Shabd Yoga or Sant Mat

Left-hand path
 Left-hand path and right-hand path
 Black art
 Black magic
 Necromancy
 Satanism
 Baphomet
 Church of Satan
 Luciferianism
 Philosophical Satanism
 Satan
 Satanic ritual abuse
 Anton LaVey
 Vampire
 Temple of Set

Magic and occult
 Aleister Crowley
Magick
 Chaos magic
 Eliphas Levi
 Enochian magic
 Goetia
 Grimoire
 Necronomicon
 Hoodoo
 Magic
 Occultism
 Pentagram
 Quareia
 Ritual magic
 Santería
 Seid
 The Book of Thoth
 Thelema
 Vodou

Martial arts
 Martial arts
 List of martial arts
 List of martial arts weapons
 Neijia
 Baguazhang
 Xingyiquan
 T'ai chi ch'uan

New Age
 Age of Aquarius
 New Age
 List of New Age topics
 Qigong

People
 Edgar Cayce
 Evelyn Underhill
 G. I. Gurdjieff
 Rudolf Steiner
 Ken Wilber

Spiritual and occult practices

Concentration
 Astral projection
 Dhikr
 Meditation
 Muraqaba
 Prayer
 Remote viewing
 Yoga

Divination
 Astrology
 Augur
 Cartomancy
 Cleromancy
 Divination
 Dowsing
 Pendulum
 Fortune-telling
 Geomancy
 Haruspex
 I Ching
 Omen
 Tarot reading

Other
 Lucid dream
 Out-of-body experience

Western

Religion, esotericism, and mysticism
 Anthroposophy
 Christian mysticism
 Christian mystics
 Esotericism
 Hermeticism
 List of occultists
 Mysticism
 Salvation
 Spiritualism
 Western mystery tradition

Organizations
 AMORC
 FUDOFSI
 FUDOSI
 Hermetic Order of the Golden Dawn
 Illuminates of Thanateros
 Knights Templar
 Ordo Templi Orientis
 Subud

People
 Constant Chevillon
 Dion Fortune
 Max Heindel
 Samuel Liddell MacGregor Mathers
 Baron Carl Reichenbach
 Rudolf Steiner
 Osho

Rosicrucianism
 Ancient Mystical Order Rosae Crucis (AMORC)
 Builders of the Adytum (BOTA)
 Fraternitas Rosae Crucis
 Hermetic Order of the Golden Dawn
 Ordo Templi Orientis
 Rosicrucian Fellowship
 Scottish Rite Freemasonry
 Societas Rosicruciana

Occultism and practical mysticism
 Alchemy
 Faith healing
 Servants of the Light

Neopaganism
 Neopaganism
 Paganism
 Rule of Three (Wiccan)
 Wicca

Christianity
 Catholicism
 Christian mysticism
 Christian Science
 Mount Athos
 Orthodoxy

Esoteric Christianity
 Anthroposophy
 Christian vegetarianism
 Theosis
 Hesychasm
 Gregory Palamas
 Philokalia

Egyptian mythology

Islam

Sufism
 Dhikr
 Lataif-e-Sitta
 Muraqaba
 Qawwali
 Sama
 Sufi cosmology
 Sufi texts
 Sufi whirling

Judaism
 Kabbalah (also spelled Qabalah, QBLH)

See also

 Involution
 Outline of religion
 Synchronicity

References

External links

 Spirituality Guide

 1
Spirituality
Spirituality-related topics
Spirituality-related topics